Georginna Battaglia Benítez (born 15 February 1995) is a Paraguayan handball player for Atlántida Sport Club and the Paraguay national team.

She represented Paraguay at the 2013 World Women's Handball Championship in Serbia, where the Paraguayan team placed 21st.

References

Paraguayan female handball players
1995 births
Living people
Atlántida Sport Club players
20th-century Paraguayan women
21st-century Paraguayan women